Jordan Mayowa Banjo (born 31 December 1992) is a British street dancer, best known as a current member of the dance troupe Diversity, who won the third series of Britain's Got Talent. He and fellow Diversity star Perri Kiely co-host the KISS weekday breakfast show.

Dancing career

Before 2007: Swift Moves Juniors
Prior to the formation of Diversity in 2007 Jordan was a member of Swift Moves Juniors, along with fellow Diversity members Sam Craske and Warren Russell.

2007–present: Diversity

Jordan is currently a member of the dance troupe Diversity, who were formed in 2007 and won the third series of Britain's Got Talent in 2009.

Television and radio presenting career

Television work and presenting 
Jordan, alongside fellow Diversity member Perri Kiely, took on the role of the backstage presenters for the fourth series of Got to Dance in the Spring of 2013.

In Summer 2013, Jordan and Perri hosted their own television show called Jordan and Perri's Ultimate Block Party, which saw them transform a club (Swim Team, Youth Club etc.) into a dance troupe.

It was announced on 17 February 2014 that Jordan and Perri would be the UK hosts for the Nickelodeon Kids’ Choice Awards 2014

Jordan and Perri were again announced as UK hosts for the Nickelodeon Kids’ Choice Awards for 2015 and 2016

On 10 November 2016, Banjo was confirmed to be taking part in I'm a Celebrity...Get Me Out of Here. Jordan Banjo was the fourth celebrity to leave the jungle on 29 November 2016.

In 2018, Banjo was the backstage digital presenter for Dancing on Ice. The following year, he started co-hosting The Greatest Dancer with Alesha Dixon.

In 2021, Banjo appeared as Viper on The Masked Dancer. He was the first celebrity to be unmasked.

Radio work
On 3 August 2020 Banjo, and fellow Diversity star Perri Kiely, became the new hosts of the KISS Breakfast Show. Replacing Tom & Daisy.

Filmography

References

External links
Official Diversity website

British hip hop dancers
English male dancers
English people of Nigerian descent
British people of Nigerian descent
British children's television presenters
Living people
1992 births
21st-century British dancers
Britain's Got Talent contestants
I'm a Celebrity...Get Me Out of Here! (British TV series) participants